Kathirgamathamby Thurairetnasingam (4 January 1941 – 17 May 2021) was a Sri Lankan Tamil civil servant, politician and Member of Parliament.

Early life
Thurairetnasingam was born on 4 January 1941.

Career
Thurairetnasingam was a Divisional Director of Education.

Thurairetnasingam was one of the Tamil National Alliance's (TNA) candidates in Trincomalee District at the 2001 parliamentary election but failed to get elected after coming second amongst the TNA candidates. However, in June 2002 he entered Parliament when he was appointed a National List Member of Parliament for the TNA, replacing M. Sivasithamparam who had died on 5 June 2002. He was one of the TNA's candidates in Trincomalee District at the 2004 parliamentary election. He was elected and re-entered Parliament. Thurairetnasingam did not contest the 2010 parliamentary election for personal reasons.

Thurairetnasingam was one of the TNA's candidates in Trincomalee District at the 2015 parliamentary election but failed to get elected after coming second amongst the TNA candidates. However, after the election he was appointed a TNA National List MP in Parliament.

Death
Thurairetnasingam died from COVID-19 on 17 May 2021, aged 80.

Electoral history

References

1941 births
Illankai Tamil Arasu Kachchi politicians
2021 deaths
Members of the 12th Parliament of Sri Lanka
Members of the 13th Parliament of Sri Lanka
Members of the 15th Parliament of Sri Lanka
People from Eastern Province, Sri Lanka
People from British Ceylon
Sri Lankan Hindus
Sri Lankan Tamil civil servants
Sri Lankan Tamil politicians
Tamil National Alliance politicians
Deaths from the COVID-19 pandemic in Sri Lanka